Charles Read Academy is a co-educational secondary school located in Corby Glen, Lincolnshire, England.  It serves the villages between Stamford, Bourne and Grantham.

The current school was built as a comprehensive in 1963, and in 1999  it was renamed the Charles Read High School to perpetuate the tradition of the former grammar school  founded in 1669 by the bequest of Charles Read (1604–1669), who  became a wealthy shipper in Hull. Read also founded Read School at Drax in Yorkshire and a grammar school at Tuxford in Notts. Reads Grammar School in Corby Glen closed in 1909.

The original grammar school building is now the Willoughby Memorial Library and Art Gallery. The building was restored  in 1965 by the Willoughby Memorial Trust which was founded by James Heathcote-Drummond-Willoughby, 3rd Earl of Ancaster in memory of his son Timothy, Lord Willoughby de Eresby, who died in 1963.

Charles Read High School converted to an academy in January 2011. In January 2013 the West Grantham Academies Trust announced the Academy would close by September 2014 but subsequently the David Ross Education Trust took responsibility for maintaining the school.

Notable former pupils
Beverley Allitt - Serial killer nurse.

References

External links
Charles Read Academy

Academies in Lincolnshire
Secondary schools in Lincolnshire